Huma Mulji (born 1970 in Karachi) is a Pakistani contemporary artist. Her works are in the collections of the Saatchi Gallery, London and the Asia Society Museum. She received the Abraaj Capital Art Prize in 2013.

Life 
Huma Mulji was born in 1970 in Karachi, Pakistan. In 1995, she completed a BFA at the Indus Valley School of Art and Architecture in Karachi, Pakistan, and in 2010, received an MFA from Transart Institute in Berlin, Germany.

From 2003 to 2015, she was an associate professor at the School of Visual Arts, Beaconhouse National University in Lahore, Pakistan. In 2016, she was a fellow at the Terra Foundation for American Art. She was Visiting Artist at the Goldsmiths' College, London, UK in 2015 to 2017. In 2017, Mulji received the Nigaah Art Award.

She is currently Lecturer at the University of West of England, Bristol, UK, and Lecturer, BA (Hons) Fine Art, at the Plymouth College of Art, UK.

Works 
Mulji's artworks were exhibited at Art Dubai in UAE, 10th Gwangju Biennale in Gwangju, South Korea, 56th Venice Biennale in Italy, Karachi Biennale 2017, in Barcelona Museum of Contemporary Art in Spain, Asia Society Museum in New York, Saatchi Gallery in UK and Project 88 in Mumbai, India. Her solo exhibitions include High Rise, in Elementa Gallery, Dubai, UAE in 2009, Crystal Pallace and Other Follies in Rothas Gallery, Lahore, Pakistan in 2010, Twilight in Project 88, Mumbai, India in 2011, and A Country of Last Things in Koel Gallery, Karachi, Pakistan in 2016.

Mulji's work characterizes how interpretations of culture, context, and cognition are held in creative tension. Drawing on the geography of visual culture that is part of her South Asian heritage, she opens up the politics of place, engaging with the absurdities of existence and our casual acceptance of all that surrounds us. The state between two things is continuously played out in Mulji's work, which places itself somewhere between sculpture and painting, photography and installation. The city, the everyday and the overlooked all serve as subjects in these deliberately awkward artworks.

Her sculptural installation Arabian Delight (2008) refers to the aspects of economic migration, to the anticipations of the migrants and corresponding reality. The piece consists of a taxidermy camel stuffed into a suitcase and addresses also the Arabization of Pakistan. It was presented at Art Dubai in 2008, but was removed after a few days to avoid a controversial topic. The removal, however, brought even more publicity to the artwork. The piece was bought by Charles Saatchi and became part of the collection of the Saatchi Gallery.

The title of her installation Ode to a Lamppost That Got Accidentally Destroyed in the Enthusiastic Widening of Canal Bank Road (2011–2017), exhibited at the Karachi Biennale 2017 (at Pioneer Book Store), refers to a central road in Lahore where Mulji lived. Its widening caused protests. This artwork comments heavy development that becomes obsolete when the priorities shift. During the Biennale, this work raised controversy. Mulji placed the pole so that it was difficult to navigate in the space. Aziz Sohail noted that it was Mulji's point to make a parallel to social inequality and to how the life of people is affected during the developmental projects. Hamna Zubair wrote:

References

Bibliography

External links 
 
 Huma Mulji at ArtFacts
 Huma Mulji at Saatchi Gallery
 Huma Mulji at OneArt, Platform for contemporary art from Asia, Africa and Latin America

Pakistani contemporary artists
Academic staff of Beaconhouse National University
Indus Valley School of Art and Architecture alumni
Artists from Lahore
Pakistani photographers
Pakistani women photographers
Pakistani sculptors
1970 births
Living people
Pakistani women academics
Pakistani women artists